Homosapien is the second solo album by British musician Pete Shelley, released in 1981. The album follows his experimental instrumental album Sky Yen (recorded in 1974 but released in 1980) and his work with the group Buzzcocks, who initially disbanded in 1981. Homosapien saw a marked departure from the punk stylings of Buzzcocks' records, being heavily influenced by the programmed synthesizer sounds and drum machines of synthpop, with the addition of Shelley on acoustic guitar. The title track was released as a UK single and was banned by the BBC due to explicit homosexual references, but was nevertheless a hit in several other countries.

Recording
The album grew out of rehearsals for the fourth Buzzcocks' album with producer Martin Rushent. After a troubled 1980, the group had convened at Manchester's Pluto Studios early in 1981 to start work on a new Buzzcocks album. However, the sessions went badly, exacerbated by EMI's refusal to pay an advance for the recordings, which put further strain on Buzzcocks' already difficult financial situation. Seeing the tensions within the band and sensing that Shelley was in need of a break, Rushent halted the sessions on 9 February and suggested to Shelley that the two of them should decamp to Rushent's newly built Genetic Sound studio at his home in Streatley, Berkshire to work on new material.

Shelley and Rushent began recording tracks on 13 February 1981, the majority of which dated back to 1973–75, before Shelley had formed  Buzzcocks. Rushent had equipped his new studio with the latest electronic equipment and, in the process of recording, Shelley and Rushent grew enormously fond of the sound they had created in the studio, which featured an interesting blend of drum machines, synthesizers and sequencers coupled with guitars. Shelley, weary of Buzzcocks' financial state, decided to leave the band after Island Records' Andrew Lauder offered him a solo record deal based on the demos. In November 1981, Shelley told the NME, "We came here [to Genetic Sound] in February to record demos but as we started to do them they sounded more and more finished, so we nudged them in that direction and within a few months we'd come up with three finished tracks. Just me and Martin in the studio with all the machines." According to Shelley, the album was recorded over "a six or seven month period".

Released at the start of the home computer boom, the album cover featured Shelley in a stylised "office", leaning on a Commodore PET computer.

Release and promotion
As was typical in the era, Homosapien had a different track listing in the United States, with three songs ("Keats' Song," "Pusher Man" and "It's Hard Enough Knowing") being excised and three non-album single A- and B-sides ("Love in Vain," "Witness the Change" and "In Love With Somebody Else") being added in their place. The album was released in the US first, due to contractual issues in the UK; originally scheduled for release on 28 August and then again on 16 November 1981, Homosapien finally received a UK release on 15 January 1982.

Two singles were released ahead of the album: the title track in September 1981 and "I Don't Know What It Is" in November 1981. The "Homosapien" single was reissued in 1982 with a different B-side. A limited edition of "I Don't Know What It Is" contained a free second 7" single, featuring "In Love with Somebody Else" on the A-side and "Maxine" on the B-side.

The US version of Homosapien was issued on compact disc in 1997 by Razor & Tie with five bonus tracks taken from Shelley's follow-up album, XL1. The original UK version was reissued on CD by Grapevine Records in 1994, and again in a remastered version in 2006 by Western Songs Ltd; both the 1994 and 2006 reissues include all the songs from the US version as bonus tracks, as well as two other B-side "dub" mixes.

New Sounds, New Styles flexidisc 
Issue 9 of the short-lived magazine New Sounds, New Styles, released in March 1982, included a free 7" yellow flexidisc featuring an extended version of "Qu'est-Ce Que C'est Que Ça", subtitled the "nsnS Dub Mix". (The other side of the single was "Amor" (nsnS Mix) by Animal Magnet.) Halfway through the album version, an obvious edit was made into a dubbed version of the track. This version of the song has never been re-released.

Critical reception

Critical reaction to the album at the time was mixed, with some reviewers disappointed by Shelley's move away from the familiar guitar sounds to the record's emphasis on synthesizers, and the lightweight nature of the songs. NME said that "Homosapien is the first chance to examine the solo Shelley over the full range of interests and emotions but it is a disjointed album... the problem is the bulk of the raw material is too ineffectual, often embarrassing and half realised, to give the songs a focal point which binds, injects or drives them with the necessary conviction or resolution... It lacks energy, urgency and desperation, something to grab on to: the power to wake you or make you or shake you up. A shame because Shelley still has a lot to give." Melody Maker was more positive, believing that by "leaving behind massed guitars and thunderous drums, Shelley and Rushent have evolved a richer and more varied dictionary of sounds... If it doesn't always convince, it's persuasive enough to warrant long-term investment."

Modern reviewers have been more favourable towards the album, considering it to be Shelley's best solo effort. AllMusic said, "Despite the utterly ridiculous [drum machine] sound, it's the one Shelley solo effort worth investigating. Unlike XL1 and Heaven and the Sea, the wry, lovelorn pop songwriting inspiration is still with him. But more importantly, this is the only attempt by Shelley to retain the compressed, tight, hard production and vocals of his band work, despite the new genre and the predominance of a 12-string acoustic in favor of the old buzzsaw." Q felt that, apart from the title song, "too many tracks... sound like Depeche Mode offcuts".

Track listings

All tracks written and composed by Pete Shelley.

UK track listing

Side one
 "Homosapien" – 4:32
 "Yesterday's Not Here" – 4:08
 "I Generate a Feeling" – 3:10
 "Keats' Song" – 1:58
 "Qu'est-ce Que C'est Que Ça" – 4:18

Side two
 "I Don't Know What It Is" – 3:27
 "Guess I Must Have Been in Love with Myself" – 3:33
 "Pusher Man" – 2:47
 "Just One of Those Affairs" – 3:37
<li> "It's Hard Enough Knowing" – 5:35

1994/2006 CD bonus tracks
<li> "Witness the Change" (B-side of "I Don't Know What It Is") – 4:46
<li> "Maxine" (B-side of "In Love with Somebody Else") – 3:29
<li> "In Love with Somebody Else" (free single with limited edition of "I Don't Know What It Is") – 2:59
 "Homosapien" (Dub) – 9:01
 "Witness the Change/I Don't Know What Love Is" (Dub) – 8:22
<li> "Love in Vain" (B-side of reissue of "Homosapien") – 3:19

 Note: "Witness the Change" and "Maxine" are labelled with track timings of 1:46 and 8:21, respectively. The 1:46 long "track 11" is actually the second part of "It's Hard Enough Knowing" and the 8:21 "track 12" contains both "Witness the Change" and "Maxine". 
 Track 15 is an unspecified instrumental "dub" mix of both songs.

US track listing

Side one
 "Homosapien" – 4:32
 "Yesterday's Not Here" – 4:08
 "Love in Vain" – 3:05
 "Just One of Those Affairs" – 3:37
 "Qu'est-ce Que C'est Que Ça" – 4:18

Side two
 "I Don't Know What It Is" – 3:27
 "Witness the Change" – 4:47
 "Guess I Must Have Been in Love with Myself" – 3:33
<li> "I Generate a Feeling" – 3:10
<li> "In Love with Somebody Else" – 3:00

1997 CD bonus tracks
 "Telephone Operator" – 3:19
 "If You Ask Me (I Won't Say No)" – 4:23
 "You Know Better Than I Know" – 5:00
<li> "(Millions of People) No One Like You" – 4:09
<li> "XL1" – 3:30

Charts

Personnel
Pete Shelley – vocals, instruments
Martin Rushent – instruments and programming, additional keyboards on US bonus tracks

Additional personnel:
Barry Adamson – bass on US bonus tracks
Jim Russell – drums on US bonus tracks
Technical:
Paul Henry - art direction
Trevor Rogers - photography
Bruno Tilley - graphics

Release history

References

1981 albums
Pete Shelley albums
Albums produced by Martin Rushent
Island Records albums